Asor or ASOR may refer to:
Asor, musical instrument "of ten strings" mentioned in the Bible
Maor Asor, Israeli footballer
American Society of Overseas Research
Applied Statistics and Operations Research
Australian Society for Operations Research